Neo/Nistico is an album by saxophonist Sal Nistico which was recorded in 1978 and released on the Bee Hive label.

Reception

The AllMusic review by Scott Yanow stated, "For this Bee Hive LP Nistico heads a sextet filled with notables ... The soloists are all in fine form during the obscure but worthy session".

Track listing

Personnel
Sal Nistico – tenor saxophone
Ted Curson – trumpet
Nick Brignola – baritone saxophone
Ronnie Mathews – piano
Sam Jones – bass
Roy Haynes – drums

References

Sal Nistico albums
1978 albums
Bee Hive Records albums